Peep is an Estonian masculine given name that may refer to:
 Peep Aru (born 1953), Estonian politician
 Peep Jänes (born 1936), Estonian architect
 Peep Lassmann (born 1948), Estonian pianist
 Peep Peterson (born 1975), Estonian politician
 Peep Sürje (1945–2013), Estonian civil engineer and professor

References

Estonian masculine given names